Callaeidae (sometimes Callaeatidae) is a family of passerine birds endemic to New Zealand. It contains three genera, with five species in the family.  One species, the huia, became extinct early in the 20th century, while the South Island kokako is critically endangered and may be extinct.

Although sometimes known as wattled crows, they are not corvids and are only distantly related to crows - New Zealand wattlebirds is the informal name for this family used by the scientific community.

Biology and evolution
They are ground-dwelling songbirds, 26–38 cm in length. They inhabit dense forests, where they feed on insects. They have strong legs and featherless wattles behind the bill. Their wings are rounded and unusually weak, giving them very limited powers of flight. They are monogamous and maintain permanent territories.

These birds seem to be remnants of an early expansion of passerines to New Zealand. Their only close relative is the stitchbird; their more distant relationships are still unknown.

A molecular study of the nuclear RAG-1 and c-mos genes of the three species within the family proved inconclusive, the data providing most support for either a basally diverging kokako or huia.

Species
 Genus Callaeas
North Island kokako, Callaeas wilsoni
South Island kokako, Callaeas cinereus (possibly extinct)
 Genus Philesturnus
North Island saddleback, Philesturnus rufusater
South Island saddleback, Philesturnus carunculatus
 Genus Heteralocha
Huia, Heteralocha acutirostris (extinct)

Gallery

References 

 
Bird families
Higher-level bird taxa restricted to New Zealand
Passeri